DWET may refer to the following:
DWET-FM, 106.7 MHz, branded on-air as 106.7 Energy FM, former flagship FM station of TV5 Network
DWET-TV, television, channel 5, flagship TV station of TV5
DWET-AM, 1179 kHz in Santiago, Isabela, branded on-air as Life Radio